University Field was a 10,000-seat multi-purpose stadium in Albany, New York. It was home to the University at Albany Great Danes football team from its opening in 1970 until 2012. The stadium was demolished after the football team's final game; after a major renovation to upgrade the site's track & field facilities, the site reopened in the fall of 2013 as the home for Albany's men's and women's teams in that sport.

In the spring of 2012, Albany began construction on a new 8,500-seat football stadium as part of a new sports complex on campus. The stadium, eventually known as Bob Ford Field, opened for the 2013 season, replacing University Field as the home of Great Danes football. It will be expandable to 24,000.

References

External links
Albany Great Danes Athletic Facilities

Defunct college football venues
Albany Great Danes football
Sports venues in Albany, New York
Multi-purpose stadiums in the United States
Demolished buildings and structures in New York (state)
1970 establishments in New York (state)
Sports venues completed in 1970
Sports venues demolished in 2012
American football venues in New York (state)
College track and field venues in the United States
Athletics (track and field) venues in New York (state)